The Centenary College of Louisiana football program, also known as the Gents, team represents Centenary College of Louisiana in college football. The school's teams were known as the Gentlemen or 'Gents'. They have not competed in football since 1941. It last competed as a member of the Southern Intercollegiate Athletic Association.

History
The school fielded several makeshift teams for the 1894, 1895, and 1896 seasons.  In 1898, the school's Board of Trustees banned intercollegiate athletic participation.  This ban was instituted due to large losses in football to Louisiana State University that resulted in two Centenary players being hospitalized.  In 1901, the ban was eased to allow the college to field a baseball team.  Intercollegiate competition at the school was fully restored with the school's move to Shreveport in 1908
The 1927 team coached by Homer H. Norton was one of the school's best ever teams, posting an undefeated 10–0 record.

Centenary fielded a college football team until 1941. The Centenary football team was discontinued for the duration of World War II due to budget deficits, and declining fan interest. An attempt to reinstate the football program was halted in 1947. And later in the 60s.

On November 10, 2021, it was announced that Centenary College is bringing back football. On March 30, 2021, a historic decision was made by naming Shreveport’s own Bryon Dawson as the new Head Coach of the Gents. Dawson, (a former Evangel & LSU standout), became the first African-American Head Football Coach in school history. The school will begin club play in 2023, and will officially take the field as a NCAA program in 2024.

References

 
American football teams established in 1909
1909 establishments in Louisiana